The Central Coast Rhinos is a semi-professional ice hockey team based in Erina, New South Wales, Australia. The team is a member of the Australian Ice Hockey League (AIHL). The team was founded in 2005 as an expansion AIHL team and played in the league for four seasons between 2005 an 2008, before formally rejoining the AIHL in 2022. The Rhinos left the league in 2009 and joined the Australian International Ice Hockey Cup, where it competed for four seasons between 2009 and 2012. The Rhinos home venue is the Erina Ice Arena, located within the Erina Fair Shopping Centre on the New South Wales Central Coast.

History

Establishment and first AIHL era (2005-08)

The Central Coast Rhinos were founded in 2005 as the Blue Haven Rhinos in Erina, New South Wales. The Rhinos were announced as an Australian Ice Hockey League (AIHL) expansion team in 2005 after securing an AIHL license. The team joined the AIHL along with fellow newcomers the Brisbane Blue Tongues, raising the league membership from six to eight teams. The Rhinos chose the Erina Ice Arena, which had recently opened in 2004, as their home venue on the Central Coast. Team governance for 2005 saw Bob Roberts elected the first Chairman of the Board for the Rhinos and Rick Williams appointed as a Director.

The Rhinos inaugural AIHL game was against the Canberra Knights at Erina Ice Arena on 17 April 2005. The new team were defeated 10–1 by the vastly more experienced Knights. Canberra took a five-goal lead into the first break before the Rhinos held the Knights to a 1–1 second period. The third period ended like the first with the Knights putting on four unanswered goals. The game was feisty with the Rhinos racking up 93 penalty minutes along with 57 to the Knights. 

The first AIHL win for the Rhinos came at home at Erina on 15 May 2005 against the Western Sydney Ice Dogs. The two teams played out a tightly contested game that ended 4–4 after regulation time. Blair Collins gave the Rhinos the lead in the first period and from there it was tit for tat until the final buzzer in the third period. Blue Haven won in overtime with a power play goal by Bryce Conrad sealing the game for the Rhinos 5–4.

The Rhinos finished their maiden AIHL season last in the league ladder, 14 points adrift of the Melbourne Ice in seventh. In twenty-six games they had produced four wins, one tie, two overtime wins and losses and seventeen regulation losses, giving the team a 24%-win rate. The Rhinos did not qualify for the 2005 finals weekend, held in Newcastle, to play for the Goodall Cup. Blue Haven’s David Wong finished the 2005 season with the third highest saves percentage, 0.865, out of any goaltender in the league. Czech import forward Dusan Halloun was the Rhinos highest points scorer for the season, ending with twenty-eight points from twenty games including ten goals and eighteen assists.

The team’s performances in 2006 remained relatively similar to their opening campaign. Six wins and twenty-two losses, gave them one less point in the league ladder than in 2005. However, the Rhinos final league position had improved from the previous season and Blue Haven had managed to avoid the wooden spoon by finishing seventh above the Canberra Knights. Canadian forward Mitch Strang produced the Rhino’s best AIHL season points return by a single player with forty-four points in 2006. Strang’s record included twenty-two goals and assists. David Wong once again led the goaltending stats for the Rhinos in 2006 with a 0.829 save percentage.

2007 and 2008 saw little improvement for the Rhinos. In 2007 the team’s sponsorship with Blue Haven ended so the team became known as the Central Coast Rhinos. On the ice the Rhinos continued to struggle and finished last in the league standings in both seasons, failing to qualify for finals. 2007 was particularly bad with just two regulation wins and one overtime win all season. Swedish centre Håkan Olsson was the team’s top points scorer in 2007 with thirty-eight points, while Canadian Jon MacMillian was the Rhinos best goaltender with a save percentage of 0.834. In 2008 Swedish pair Simon Kummu and Markus Claesson topped the team’s scoring and goaltending charts with thirty points and 0.807 save percentage respectfully.

Ahead of the 2009 the Rhinos participated in the annual Wilson Cup along with the other three NSW based AIHL teams (Ice Dogs, Newcastle North Stars and AIHL Bears). The cup was played in the AIHL pre-season and acted as a warm-up event to the regular season to promote youth development. The home and away round-robin format was followed by a play-off and grand final. Central Coast won the 2009 edition of the Wilson Cup, lifting the team’s first ever trophy by defeating the Western Sydney Ice Dogs 4–3 in a shootout in the cup final.

However, the Wilson Cup triumph would prove to be the Rhinos final involvement with the AIHL and against AIHL opponents. Central Coast’s owner, Ellis Southee, did not sign a new license contract with the AIHL after disagreements around the terms of the new licensing arrangements could not be resolved in time for the 2009 season. The result was the withdrawal of the Central Coast Rhinos from the AIHL and the forfeiting of the AIHL license the team held.

Australian International Ice Hockey Cup era (2009-12)

After leaving the AIHL, the Central Coast Rhinos joined the newly created independent annual ice hockey tournament named Australian International Ice Hockey Cup (AIIHC). The tournament was held in Sydney, at the Sydney Ice Arena and the Central Coast, at the Erina Ice Arena, and was administered by the operator of the two rinks. It featured the Rhinos along with selection teams representing Canada (Maples), the United States (Eagles) and Europe (Stars). The operation of AIIHC led to a notice to the Australian Competition & Consumer Commission (ACCC) regarding the application of suspensions and expulsions by Ice Hockey Australia on non-sanctioned ice hockey events and participants in Australia.

The Rhinos enjoyed a successful period playing in the AIIHC between 2009 and 2012. In 2009, they finished the round-robin section of the tournament first after thirteen games, clinching a spot in the play-offs. On 15 August 2009, the Rhinos faced the Canadian Maples in the AIIHC grand final at Erina Ice Arena. In front of 750 people, Central Coast were defeated 7–4 despite taking a two-goal lead in the first period. Th Rhinos would go on to reach the grand final of the AIIHC two more times, in 2010 and 2011, even with the AIIHC expanding in 2011 to five teams (Rhinos, Eagles, Toronto Moose, Montreal Maples and Sydney International Giants). Just Like in 2009, Central Coast would come away runners-up on both occasions, losing the grand finals to the Canadian Maples and USA Eagles respectfully. In 2012 the tournament was played in a shorter format and the Rhinos lost all four of their games, failing to qualify for the grand final. In 2013, the AIIHC switched the format of the tournament to being a two team (USA vs Canada) format, leaving the Central Coast Rhinos without a competition to compete in.

In addition to the AIIHC, during this period, in 2010, the Rhinos entered and competed in the NSW East Coast Super League (ECSL) for one season. The team finished first in the regular season but were knocked out of the play-offs in the semi-finals. In 2011, the Rhinos welcomed the New Zealand National Ice hockey Team to Erina in a two game exhibition series held on 27 March and 1 April 2011.

Wilderness (2013-21)

In 2013-14 the Rhinos lined up two exhibition games against the Sydney Bears at Erina Ice Arena. This was the first re-engagement with the AIHL since the team had left in 2009. The first of these matches was played on 16 November 2013, and saw the Rhinos win 8–4. Game two saw the Bears reverse the result and defeat the hosts 8–2, in their lead-up to the Wilson Cup and 2014 AIHL season.

On 17 October 2014, the Rhinos announced they had applied to re-enter the AIHL for the 2015 season. Central Coast lodged their application for an AIHL licence at the 2014 AIHL annual general meeting (AGM), held in October. Two days later the AIHL revealed they had rejected the re-entry application by the Central Coast Rhinos but did not publicly disclose any reasons for their decision. The decision continued the hiatus of top level ice hockey on the Central Coast.

In 2019, the owner of the Erina Ice Arena, Lendlease, announced the rink would close for mandatory upgrades to meet legislative standards that has been updated since the arena was built in 2004. The closure of the rink would last for one year. On 3 January 2021, Erina Ice Arena reopened to the public following the completion of the mandatory upgrade works. In February 2022, Erina Ice Arena management announced they had been successful in obtaining a NSW Government regional sports facility fund grant of almost $600,000 for upgrade improvements to the rink. The money would be spent primarily on bathroom, lighting and ice hockey netting upgrades as well as safety and accessibility improvements to the foyer and grandstand.

Re-entry to the AIHL (2022-Present)

The Rhinos revealed in March 2022 that they had re-applied to re-enter the AIHL after having their 2014 bid rejected. The news came on the back of the rival Pacific Hockey League announcing a new team, The Coast, to play out of Erina Ice Arena in 2022. Three days later on 10 March the AIHL granted the Rhinos a new license for the AIHL and announced the team would play exhibition games against AIHL opposition in 2022 before joining the league’s regular season in 2023.

In early April 2022, the AIHL released its revised 2022 season game schedule with the Central Coast Rhinos scheduled to play seven exhibition games, both home and away between April and August 2022. These games involve four AIHL teams including, Sydney Ice Dogs, Brisbane Lightning, CBR Brave and Sydney Bears. In mid-April, an additional pre-season exhibition game was added to the Rhinos 2022 schedule against the Bears to be held at Erina on 24 April.

Season by season results

Australian Ice Hockey League

1 As of the 2006 AIHL season, all games will have a winner.

Honours

Championships

Wilson Cup 
 Champions (1): 2009

Australian International Ice Hockey Cup
 Runners-Up (3): 2009, 2010, 2011

Players

Current roster

Team roster for the 2008 AIHL season

Team staff
Current as of 2008 AIHL season.

Leaders

Team captains
The Rhinos have had three captains in the team's AIHL history.

References:

Head coaches
The Rhinos have had four head coaches in the team's AIHL history.

References:

Broadcasting
TV and SVOD: 
Kayo Sports (2022-present) – Domestic SVOD broadcasting in Australia as part of the league wide deal struck in the lead up to the 2022 AIHL season.

Sportradar (2022-present) – International SVOD broadcasting in North America and Europe as part of a league-wide 3-year deal signed in March 2022 in the lead up to the 2022 AIHL season.

Fox Sports (2022–present) – Domestic TV broadcasting deal that has been in place since 2013 with Fox Sports to show one game a round, normally on Thursday's at 4:30 pm or after NHL games during NHL season.

References

External links

 Central Coast Rhinos official website
 AIHL official website
 Central Coast Rhinos official Facebook
 Central Coast Rhinos news
 Erina Ice Arena official website

2005 establishments in Australia
Australian Ice Hockey League teams
Sport on the Central Coast (New South Wales)
Ice hockey teams in Australia
Sports teams in New South Wales
Ice hockey clubs established in 2005
East Coast Super League